La'Keshia Frett (born June 12, 1975) is a former collegiate and professional basketball player. She is currently an assistant coach for the women's basketball team at Auburn University.

High school
Born in Carmel, California, Frett attended Phoebus High School in Hampton, Virginia, where she was named a High School All-American by the WBCA. She participated in the WBCA  High School All-America Game in 1993, scoring six points.  Additionally, Frett was named the 1993 Gatorade Female Basketball Player of the Year. She was named a Parade All-American in both 1992 and 1993.

University of Georgia
After being named the 1993 National Prep Player of the Year at Phoebus High School in Hampton, Virginia, Frett attended the University of Georgia and played for their women's basketball team, averaging 15.2 points and 6.9 rebounds during her collegiate career from 1993 to 1997.

She was a three-time All-Southeastern Conference (SEC) first team selection, and was named the 1993-94 "SEC Freshman of the Year". In 1996, Frett was named to the Final Four All Tournament team.

By the time she graduated, she had scored 242 points in 15 NCAA tournament games, ranking third time all-time at UGA. She competed with USA Basketball as a member of the 1994  Jones Cup Team that won the Gold in Taipei.

Georgia statistics
Source

USA Basketball
Frett was named to the team representing the US at the  1994 William Jones Cup competition in Taipei, Taiwan. The USA team won all eight games, winning the gold medal, but not without close calls. In three games the teams had to come from behind to win. One preliminary game ended up as a single-point victory, and the gold medal game went to overtime before the USA team beat South Korea by a single point, 90–89.

Frett represented the US at the 1995 World University Games held in Fukuoka, Japan in August and September 1995. The team had a record of 5–1, securing the silver medal. The USA teams won early and reached a record of 5–0 when the USA beat Yugoslavia. In the semi-final game, the USA faced Russia. The team was behind much of the first half but managed to tie the game at the half. The USA broke the game open in the second half and won 101–74, with Frett contributing a double-double, 20 points and 13 rebounds. The gold medal match was against unbeaten Italy. The Italian team started strong, scoring 12 of the first 14 points of  the contest. The USA took a small lead in the second half, but the team from Italy responded with a ten-point run, and won the game and the gold medal by a score of 73–65. Frett was the leading scorer for the USA team with 18.0 points per game.

Frett again represented the US at the 1997 World University Games held in Marsala, Sicily, Italy in August 1997. The USA team won all six games, earning the gold medal at the event. In the opening game Frett was the leading scorer for the US with 14 points. She went on to average 10.2 points per game.

ABL and WNBA
After graduating from college, Frett started her professional career in 1997 playing two seasons for the Philadelphia Rage of the American Basketball League (ABL).

After the ABL folded due to financial difficulties, she was selected by the Los Angeles Sparks in the 1999 WNBA Draft, and later played for the Sparks during the 1999 and 2000 seasons.

After the 2000 season ended, the Sparks traded Frett to the Sacramento Monarchs in exchange for Latasha Byears.  Frett played for the Monarchs for the next three seasons before signing a free agent contract with the Charlotte Sting.  However, the Sting waived her halfway through the 2004 season.

A week after being waived, she signed with the New York Liberty and played for them during the remainder of the season, as well as the following 2005 season.

Shortly after the 2005 WNBA season ended, Frett returned to her alma mater, the University of Georgia, after being hired as an assistant coach for the women's basketball team for the 2005–06 season. In April 2006, Frett announced her retirement from the WNBA to devote herself full-time to her collegiate coaching position.

In 2021, she became an assistant coach with the Atlanta Dream.

Notes

External links
WNBA Player Profile
 University of Georgia Bulldogs coaching biography
April 10, 2006 New York Liberty press release on Frett's retirement from the WNBA

1975 births
Living people
All-American college women's basketball players
American women's basketball coaches
American women's basketball players
Basketball players from California
Basketball players from Virginia
Charlotte Sting players
Georgia Lady Bulldogs basketball coaches
Georgia Lady Bulldogs basketball players
Los Angeles Sparks draft picks
Los Angeles Sparks players
New York Liberty players
Parade High School All-Americans (girls' basketball)
People from Carmel-by-the-Sea, California
Philadelphia Rage players
Power forwards (basketball)
Sacramento Monarchs players
Sportspeople from Hampton, Virginia
Universiade gold medalists for the United States
Universiade medalists in basketball
United States women's national basketball team players